The Francis Rahrer House, at 309 School St. in Fromberg, Montana, was built in 1921.  It was listed on the National Register of Historic Places in 1993.

It is a one-and-a-half-story wood frame Craftsman-style house, upon a stone foundation.  Its front porch, which runs nearly all the way across the house, was enclosed in 1937 with fixed windows.

It was built by carpenter W.C. Parker.

The listing included a second contributing building, a garage also built in 1921.

References

American Craftsman architecture in Montana
National Register of Historic Places in Carbon County, Montana
Houses completed in 1921
1921 establishments in Montana
Houses in Carbon County, Montana
Houses on the National Register of Historic Places in Montana